Kamil Antoni Wilczek (born 14 January 1988) is a Polish professional footballer who plays for Piast Gliwice and the Poland national team. He is usually deployed as a striker for both club and country.

Wilczek played for Carpi in 2015, before making the move to the danish club Brøndby IF half a year later in January 2016. He became captain of Brøndby in 2019 following the departures of Johan Larsson and Benedikt Röcker. He is also the club's all-time leading Superliga-goalscorer, having scored a total of 71 goals in the competition. After a short stay at Göztepe, he made a highly controversial move to Brøndby's archrivals FC Copenhagen in August 2020, signing a three-year contract.

In October 2016, Wilczek won his first cap for Poland, having previously played for the under-21 team.

Club career

Early career
Born in Wodzisław Śląski, Wilczek began his career with local club WSP Wodzisław Śląski, then moved on loan to LKS Silesia Lubomia. He also played for UD Horadada and Elche CF Ilicitano for short periods before moving on to GKS Jastrzębie in the Polish First League from September 2007 to December 2008. He joined Piast Gliwice during the winter transfer window and made his Ekstraklasa debut in February 2009. In June 2010, he moved to Zagłębie Lubin, where he played for three years before returning to Piast Gliwice in 2013. In 2015, he became the top goalscorer of the Ekstraklasa with 20 goals.

Following the expiration of his contract with Gliwice in June 2015, Wilczek signed a three-year deal with Carpi. However, he failed to impress in Italy and only made three appearances for the club.

Brøndby
In January 2016, Wilczek signed a three-and-a-half year contract with Danish club Brøndby IF. In April 2018, with Brøndby in the race for the Superliga title, Wilczek scored seven goals in five matches. His performances led to him being named as the Danish Superliga Player of the Month for April 2018. On 10 May 2018, he scored twice as Brøndby beat Silkeborg IF 3–1 in the 2017–18 Danish Cup final. At the end of the spring campaign Wilczek had scored 11 goals in 14 matches which earned him the Tipsbladet Player of the Spring Award.

Wilczek started the 2018–19 season where he left off, opening his goalscoring account in the 63rd minute of the season opener against Randers FC, which ended in a 2–0 away win. In the following weeks, Wilczek scored against Vejle Boldklub and FC Nordsjælland before scoring a brace against newly promoted Vendsyssel FF, helping Brøndby win the match 2–1. He continued his goalscoring form throughout the fall, becoming one of the most scoring players in Europe in 2018, only surpassed by the likes of Cristiano Ronaldo and Lionel Messi. In December 2018, Wilczek signed a two-year contract extension at Brøndby, which would keep him at the club until 2021. This deal came after a record year for the Polish striker: his 25 league goals of 2018 made him highest scoring player of a calendar year in Danish Superliga history.

After the departure of Benedikt Röcker, Wilczek was appointed as new permanent club captain, having temporarily replaced the former captain while he was benched during large parts of the spring campaign. He continued his goal form in the 2019–20 season, closing in on the club record for most goals in the Superliga held by Brøndby-legend, Ebbe Sand. Wilczek scored braces against OB, Hobro IK, as well as in the Copenhagen Derby against F.C. Copenhagen, securing a 3–1 win over the archrivals. On 1 December, Wilczek scored in a loss to F.C. Copenhagen at Telia Parken, his 70th Superliga goal for Brøndby, claiming the record for most goals scored in the Superliga for Brøndby from Sand.

Göztepe
On 22 January 2020, Turkish Süper Lig club Göztepe SK confirmed the signing of Wilczek on a one-and-a-half year contract. He made his first appearance on 26 January, coming on as an 88th-minute substitute for Cameron Jerome as Göztepe defeated Beşiktaş 2–1. On 8 July, he scored his first goal for the club – a penalty shot – in a 2–2 draw against Ankaragücü. Wilczek made 14 league appearances for Göztepe, scoring one goal.

Copenhagen
On 6 August 2020, less than seven months after leaving Brøndby, Wilczek made a surprising and controversial move to Brøndby's bitter rivals Copenhagen. He signed a three-year contract with the club. Upon signing, he stated that he understood the disappointment of Brøndby's fans, but that he hoped they would also see the situation from his point of view. Wilczek had at that point already been labelled "Judas" by some Brøndby supporters, with angry fans of the team recording videos of themselves burning his jersey. On the evening after the move was announced, a large group of fans protested in front of Brøndby Stadium to show their discontent with Wilczek's transfer.

On 13 September, in the first match-day of the season, Wilczek scored a brace in a 3–2 loss to OB after being down 3–0 at half-time. He made his first European appearance for Copenhagen on 17 September in a 2–1 win over IFK Göteborg at Ullevi in the second qualifying round of the Europa League. A few days later, on 20 September, Wilczek scored the opener against former club and rivals Brøndby, as Copenhagen lost 2–1.

Third stint at Piast
On 31 January 2022, Wilczek terminated his contract with Copenhagen and joined Piast Gliwice on a two-and-a-half-year deal, making it the third time in his career he signed with the Silesian side.

International career
Wilczek was a part of Poland u19 and Poland u21 teams.

He got his debut call-up in the Poland national team for the UEFA Euro 2016 qualifiers against Scotland and Republic of Ireland in October 2015. He debuted for Poland in a 2–1 2018 World Cup qualification win over Armenia 11 October 2016.

In May 2018 he was included in the Poland preliminary 35-man team for the 2018 World Cup in Russia. However, he did not make the final 23.

Career statistics

Club

International

Honours
Brøndby IF
Danish Cup: 2017–18

Individual
Ekstraklasa top scorer: 2014–15 (20 goals)
Ekstraklasa Best Player: 2014–15
Ekstraklasa Best Forward: 2014–15
 Tipsbladet Player of the Spring: 2018
Brøndby Player of the Year: 2018, 2019
Superliga Player of the Month: October 2019

References

External links
 
 

1988 births
Living people
People from Wodzisław Śląski
Sportspeople from Silesian Voivodeship
Association football forwards
Polish footballers
Polish expatriate sportspeople in Spain
Polish expatriate sportspeople in Italy
Polish expatriate sportspeople in Denmark
Polish expatriate sportspeople in Turkey
Poland international footballers
Poland under-21 international footballers
Poland youth international footballers
Polish expatriate footballers
Elche CF Ilicitano footballers
Piast Gliwice players
Zagłębie Lubin players
A.C. Carpi players
Brøndby IF players
F.C. Copenhagen players
Ekstraklasa players
Serie A players
Danish Superliga players
Expatriate footballers in Spain
Expatriate footballers in Italy
Expatriate men's footballers in Denmark
Expatriate footballers in Turkey
GKS Jastrzębie players
Göztepe S.K. footballers